Santa Maria, officially the Municipality of Santa Maria, is a 2nd class municipality in the province of Laguna, Philippines. According to the 2020 census, it has a population of 34,511 people.

History
From Mabitac was a mountain path pointed northward leading to a village called Caboan. On this path near the village gateway gathers people and Chinese merchants selling and buying wares, livestock and other farm produce. Aetas sell their herbs, medicinal rootstocks, and wild honey. Women from Mabitac trade chickens with clay pots, pandan mats, and sabutan hats. It was a market place.

Caboan came from the Tagalog word “Kabuhuan,” which means bamboo thicket. “Buho,” is a genus of bamboo, which grows abundantly in the village. Caboan is a miracle of nature. Rare orchids and wild flowers decorated its forests. Its falls called “Ambon-ambon” located in one corner of the village looks like a stair of giant rocks going up to heaven. Its Nilubugan River was rich in exquisite white rocks and stones and its crystal-clear water seems to drift to nowhere.

This village used to be a part of then Guiling-guiling, now Siniloan. Padre Antonio de la Llave was the first parish priest of Caboan. Residents believe that he was the one responsible for making the village a town and in renaming it into San Miguel de Caboan in 1602.

A legend tells the story of how San Miguel de Caboan became Santa María. The story says that a couple going home from the market place after trading their vegetable harvest with their basic needs, found lying on the ground an image of the blessed virgin. At first, they thought it was a porcelain piece dropped by a Chinese merchant. Porcelain was a very expensive commodity during the period as it is today. After careful examination, they recognized the image as that of the Virgin Mary. The couple made an altar in their house and enthroned the image there.

The next morning the couple was astonished. The image was gone. They looked for the image all over, until they decided to look at the place where they found it. They saw a group of women, poking with a long stick something on the ground that looked like a piece of ivory. It was the image of the Virgin. It was back at the very spot where they found it.

In 1613, Padre Geronimo Vásquez built the first church on the spot where the couple found the image of the Virgin. Thus, San Miguel de Caboan became Santa María de los Ángeles, in short — Santa María. The Chinese uprising in 1639 destroyed the church. Parishioners rebuilt it in 1669, before the earthquake of 1880 leveled it again to the ground. Padre Leopoldo Arellano raised it once more in 1891. The facade of the church is still surviving and is now known as the Nuestra Señora de los Angeles Parish Church. The church was again partly destroyed during the earthquake of August 20, 1937, but was not reconstructed until after the Liberation in 1945.

Pre-Spanish and Spanish Regime

The first and patronal name of Santa Maria was San Miguel de Caboan. San Miguel was the name given by the Spanish friar who founded the tow, which was in honor of St. Michael the Archangel, the town's first patron. Caboan came from the native term "kabuhuan", a kind of bamboo abundant in the place during that time. The first church was built in the same place where the present church is erected. It was then made of cogon and bamboo. There was also the first Parochial school ran by Spanish friars. According to information, Catholic faith was well embraced by the people. It was believed that the people of this town had always been good and loyal followers. No remarkable Spanish relics could be traced in this town nowadays. It is only the facade of the church in which traces of Spanish culture could be seen as shown by the materials in which it was made of. That one could distinguish that there had been such regime in this town. However, folk tales on "Bailes and Comparsas" could still be heard among elders.

Santa Maria During American Regime

When the Philippines was ceded to the United States of America by Spain, the Filipinos realized that they were under another authority for the second time. The people of Santa Maria were at first confused of the new kind of life. So, whenever they heard that Americans were coming, men went up the mountains to evade membership to the American Army. This according to them was due to their sad experience with the Spanish rule.

The people of Santa Maria were so afraid of the new policies they might encounter. Whenever they heard that Americans would be coming to town, all men in the family went up the mountains and hide. Until the time came when they realized that Americans were far better than the Spaniards when they were given our independence on June 12, 1898.

In 1903, Santa Maria was reduced to a barrio of Mabitac under Act 939, when the 30 municipalities of La Laguna was reduced to just 19. Seven years later, in 1910, Santa Maria would be restored as an independent municipality under Executive Order No. 72, s. 1909.

The United States Congress passed a law which granted the Philippine Government the right to give the public lands to persons who wanted to cultivate them. This will become the policy of attraction of the late Municipal President Leoncio Real. Large tracts of public land were opened for agricultural purposes. This cause the influx of settlers from the neighboring towns and provinces then, the development of agriculture as well as the establishment of the different barrios began. People were encouraged to apply for homestead. More lands were given to the landless. The U.S. Congress helped much in the agricultural development of the country soon after peace was declared.

Many farms were abandoned and locust destroyed the crops planted in the place. The U.S. Government aided the people through importing rice to the countries.

Work animals also brought in to improve the animal resources in the country. The Bureau of Agriculture was established. The farmers were taught better farming methods and control of plant pest and diseases. Road and transportation were improved. The different means of communications such as radio telegraph, and postal services were introduced and modernized.

The town of Santa Maria was benefited by these changes. Jazz and rhumba music took the Philippine air.

Santa Maria During the Japanese Regime

Guerilla warfare was carried on different places in the barrios and mountains. There were also attacks made at the poblacion where there were Japanese garrisons.

The guerilla units who helped the natives of Santa Maria were Marking's Filipino-American ROTC Hunters and V-J units. Their aim was to fight for freedom against the Japanese forces. The people in this town helped these units in terms of food, clothing and cash.

There were great incident that took place in this town during the regime. The guerilla troop with the leadership of Martin Bautista, a native of this town invaded the Japanese headquarters which was located at the oldest school building. Some civilians were badly hurt. Several houses near the school building were destroyed. Another unforgettable incident that happened in 1942 was when Captain Nacamura, a high-ranking official of the Japanese Imperial Army, was killed. He and his men encountered the guerillas at Barrio Kayhacat. After his death, the natives of Santa Maria witnessed the ceremonial burning of his dead body. The people believed that the ash will be sent to his family. Another Japanese official who was killed was Captain Sakai. He was killed outside the town of Santa Maria by Colonel Pabling, a native of Antipolo, Rizal. One system made by the sponsored Republic of Japan to counteract guerilla was the zone system, where all male inhabitants suspected of being a guerilla were kept in the church without food, little water and tortured or massacred. Ponciano "Sabu" Arida of Santa Maria was the youngest guerilla in the country. He was only eleven (11) years old when he made some heroic deeds in our town. He was the runner of the guerilla spy and supply officer. In 1944, Alyas Capadudia, a HUKBALAHAP (Hukbong Bayan Laban sa Hapon) encountered the Japanese Army at Barrio Bubucal. Some guerillas died in this fight and Japanese burned several houses.

On January 2, 1942, the Japanese Military Administration was established headed by Director General. All public officials in the town were ordered to stay at their post. Civil liberties of the people were suppressed. Economy was geared to the demands of the occupying forces. Education was revamped to reorient Filipino thinking along Japanese lines. Political life was limited to the Japanese. Jose P. Laurel was appointed the President of the Japanese sponsored Republic. Japanese did not allow any political parties except the KALIBAPI. Land farm products, commerce, transportation and prime commodities were ceased. Japanese restricted freedom of movement of the Filipinos. Social activities in and out of town were very few. Orientation classes were held to spread Japanese culture. Niponggo, the Japanese language, was taught in all schools as well as in government and private officers.

Post-War to the Present

Rehabilitation began little by little after the liberation. Aids and war damages arrived painting a new the town. Schools were open, bridges were rebuilt, roads were constructed and the economy of the people was gradually elevated. Adoption of the policies of a newly independent nation was at last accepted by the people.

At present, the Municipality of Santa Maria, situated in the Province of Laguna, having 25 barangays and possessing a population of more than 30,000, faces numerous challenges for the future. Being agricultural town and having a big land area, the place promises to be one of the quality producing citrus in Southern Tagalog. It has also been named as the "Rice Granary of Laguna". Endowed with agricultural lands, the place calls for knowledgeable agriculturist, soil technologist and the like to help develop and improve more of its undeveloped areas. At present, there is also a need for more doctors, lawyers and other kinds of professionals who are really native of the town to really look for the welfare of the people. There is a lack of these careers at present that the town folks still go to other places whenever the need arises. This is one of the great challenges that the people looks forward too.

Geography

Santa Maria is the northernmost town in Laguna.

Bounded by the provinces of Rizal and Quezon from the western portion up to the northern tip down north eastern part, the town has a mountainous terrain. With the MARILAQUE Sub-Regional Plan (Manila-Rizal-Laguna-Quezon), the municipality functions as link between the highly industrialized capital and the marine life-rich Quezon province. A 43 kilometer road network, the Marcos Highway, physically connects to the eyed site for the International Port. Silangan Railway Express 2000 (MARILAQUE Railway) is another infrastructure project proposed for implementation under the PPP Scheme.

Barangays

Santa María is politically subdivided into 25 barangays: Among these barangays, 6 are classified as highland/upland barangays, 12 are inland barangays, while the remaining 7 are situated in the lowland (Valley area).

Climate

Demographics

Economy

Government

Elected officials

Elections

2022

Mayoral elections

Vice mayoral elections

Congressional elections

Councilor elections

Education

References

External links

Official Website of Laguna Government
Philippine Census Information
Local Governance Performance Management System

Municipalities of Laguna (province)